Women's Giant Slalom World Cup 1969/1970

Final point standings

In Women's Giant Slalom World Cup 1969/70 the best 3 results count.

References
 fis-ski.com

Women's Giant Slalom
FIS Alpine Ski World Cup women's giant slalom discipline titles